Visayaseguenzia is a genus of sea snails, marine gastropod mollusks in the family Seguenziidae.

Species
Species within the genus Visayaseguenzia include:
 Visayaseguenzia cumingi Poppe, Tagaro & Dekker, 2006
 Visayaseguenzia maestratii Poppe, Tagaro & Dekker, 2006

References

 Poppe G.T., Tagaro S.P. & Dekker H. (2006) The Seguenziidae, Chilodontidae, Trochidae, Calliostomatidae and Solariellidae of the Philippine Islands. Visaya Supplement 2: 1-228. page(s): 28

 
Seguenziidae